Heidi, bienvenida a casa is a telenovela created and produced by Marcela Citterio for Nickelodeon Latin America. Based on the 1881 children's novel by Johanna Spyri, Heidi, it stars Chiara Francia as the titular character. The series was previewed digitally on Nick Play and MundoNick.com on March 10, 2017. Its official premiere was on March 13, 2017.

The series follows the story of Heidi, a girl who lives in the mountains with her grandfather, her best friend and her animals, until her Aunt Dete arrives to take her to live in the city.

Music for the show was produced by Martin Della Nina and Sebastian De La Riega at Estudio Santito

On March 3, 2017, Mondo TV confirmed that the series would be renewed for two more seasons.

Plot
Heidi, an adventurous mountain girl sees how her life changes when she has to move to the city. There she will live in the Seseman mansion and meet Clara, a girl with agoraphobia that Heidi will try to help.

Series overview

Cast

Main 

 Chiara Francia as Heidi
 Mercedes Lambre as Emma
 Victorio D’Alessandro as Toro 
 Mario Guerci as Sesemann 
 Florencia Benitez as Rottenmeier 
 Victoria Ramos as Clara

Recurring 

 Melisa Garat as Maxine 
 Minerva Casero as Morena
 Joaquín Ochoa as Lolo
 Francisco Francia (Pancho) as Pedro
 Santiago Achaga as Junior
 Yoyi Francella as Vicky
 Nicolás Di Pace as Imanol/Oliver
 Nicolás Riedel as Boris
 Paulina Patterson as Sol
 Sofía Morandi as Abril
 Tiziano Francia as Diego
 Sol Estevanez as Rita
 Daniel Campomenosi as Ulises
 Mónica Bruni as Dete
 Fernando Fernández as Abuelito
 Adriana Salonia as Paulina
 Pietro Sorba as Pietro
 Marger Sealey as Sheila

Special participation 
 Santiago Talledo as Clemente
 Pepe Monje as Gerardo

References 

2017 Argentine television series debuts
2019 Argentine television series endings
2017 telenovelas
Argentine telenovelas
Spanish-language telenovelas
Heidi television series
Children's telenovelas
Nickelodeon telenovelas
Spanish-language Nickelodeon original programming
Television series about teenagers